Lingambudhi Lake is a lake in the city of Mysore, India.

History 
This Lake was built by Mummadi Krishnaraja Wadiyar in 1828 in memory of his Maharani Krishna Vilasa Lingajammanni

Botanical Garden 
Botanical Garden was established in the Lake premises in 2020. Botanical garden is divided to many blocks based on Plant names. Namely, Arboretum Block, Rose Block, Argentea Block, Plumeria Block, Topiary Block, Fruits Block, Butterfly Park, Minor Fruit Block, Native Species Block, Palms Block, Medicinal and Aromatic Block, Rockeries Block, Lotus Pond, Bamboo Block, Ficus and Endangered Species Block

Rabindranath Tagore Layout
Rabindranath Tagore Layout is one of the six new layout of Mysore city envisaged by the Mysore Urban Development Authority in 2015.

See also
 Srirampur
 Lingam Budhi Park

References

External links
Mysore Nature|Lingambudhi Lake
Mysore Nature | Lingambudhi Lake | Bird Checklist

Lakes of Mysore